Måns Olström (born 1 November 1996) is a Swedish footballer who plays for Västra Frölunda IF as a midfielder.

References

External links
 

1996 births
Living people
Association football defenders
Allsvenskan players
Ettan Fotboll players
Division 2 (Swedish football) players
Kalmar FF players
Oskarshamns AIK players
Västra Frölunda IF players
Swedish footballers
Lindsdals IF players